Selena Rudge (born 5 November 1975) is an English female rugby union player. She represented  at the 2006 Women's Rugby World Cup.

References

1975 births
Living people
England women's international rugby union players
English female rugby union players
Female rugby union players